The Theory of Deadly Initials was an hypothesis published in the Journal of Psychosomatic Research in 1999, which proposed that there is a link between the lifespan of human males and their initials. The research, carried out by psychologists Nicholas Christenfeld, David Phillips and Laura Glynn, and published in the paper "What's in a Name: Mortality and the Power of Symbols", suggested that men with "negative" sets of initials (e.g. DIE or PIG) have, on average, a shorter lifespan than those with "positive" initials (e.g. ACE, VIP).

The average increase in life expectancy for a set of positive initials was claimed to be 4.48 years, while the average decrease in life expectancy for negative initials was claimed as 2.8 years.  This is attributed to stress from teasing and lower self-worth in individuals with "deadly" initials.

In 2005, the hypothesis was investigated by Gary Smith, an economics professor at Pomona College in Claremont, California, and Stilian Morrison, a student there. They were unable to find any pattern in the samples they studied.

The original research was conducted by comparing the age of people who died within a given year, while the second investigation compared the lifespans of people who were born in a given year.

References

External links
 Guardian article in which the theory is refuted: "The Christenfeld study compared the ages of all the people who died in a particular year. But, say Smith and Morrison, if - instead - you look at the lifespans of all the people who were born in a particular year, the pattern doesn't show up. Also, they say, if you use a more complete list of "good" and "bad" words, the effect doesn't appear."

Experimental psychology